Happy Talk Band is a seminal alt country/rock band from New Orleans featuring the songwriting of Luke Allen.  The band pulls influences from traditional country and early rock.  The band's music contains themes including the joys and pitfalls of booze, fist fighting, bank robbery, murder, religion, dope, exotic dancing, and family values.  Happy Talk Band's discography is available on the New Orleans-based label Piety Street [Files and Archaic Media], which is the in house label of Piety Street Recording.

Original Band Members 
 Luke Allen - Vocals, Guitar, Songwriter
 Bailey Smith - Lead Guitar
 Mike Lenore - Upright Bass
 Andy Harris - Drums

Current Band Members 
The current lineup of the band contains former members of the disbanded New Orleans rock group Morning 40 Federation. Accomplished solo artist Alex McMurray has also joined the most recent lineup.

 Luke Allen: Lead Vocal, Guitar, Songwriter
 Bailey Smith: Guitar, Vocals
 Alex McMurray: Guitar, Banjo, Vocals
 Steve Calandra: Bass Guitar, Vocals
 Mike Andrepont: Drums
 Casey McAllister: Pianos, Organ, Theremin, Guitar, Banjo, Vocals

Discography 
 Total Death Benefit (2004) 
 There there (2007) 
 Starve a Fever (2010)

References

External links 
 happytalkband.com

Musicians from New Orleans